Caecossonus is a genus of true weevils in the beetle family Curculionidae. There are at least three described species in Caecossonus.

Species
These three species belong to the genus Caecossonus:
 Caecossonus continuus Howden, 1992
 Caecossonus dentipes Gilbert, 1955
 Caecossonus sylvaticus Howden, 1992

References

Further reading

 
 
 

Molytinae
Articles created by Qbugbot